Sunnfjord is a municipality in Vestland county, Norway. It is located in the traditional district of Sunnfjord. The administrative centre of the municipality is the town of Førde. Other villages in the municipality include Naustdal, Sande, Vassenden, and Skei.
 
The  municipality is the 27th largest by area out of the 356 municipalities in Norway. Sunnfjord is the 56th most populous municipality in Norway with a population of 22,116.

General information
The municipality was established on 1 January 2020 when the old municipalities of Førde, Gaular, Jølster, and Naustdal were merged.

Name
The municipality was named after the traditional district of Sunnfjord, in which it is located. The first part of the name sunn- means "southern" and the last part of the name is fjord, thus it is the southern fjord region (as opposed to the nearby Nordfjord region (the northern fjord region).

Coat of arms
The coat of arms was approved in 2019 for use starting on 1 January 2020. The green arms show a design of four white rivers joining a larger body of water. The rivers symbolize the four main rivers of Sunnfjord: Nausta, Gaula, Anga, and Jølstra. It was meant to symbolize the many waterfalls and rivers in the municipality as well as strength and unity.

Churches
The Church of Norway has six parishes within the municipality of Sunnfjord. It is part of the Sunnfjord prosti (deanery) in the Diocese of Bjørgvin.

Government
All municipalities in Norway, including Sunnfjord, are responsible for primary education (through 10th grade), outpatient health services, senior citizen services, unemployment and other social services, zoning, economic development, and municipal roads. The municipality is governed by a municipal council of elected representatives, which in turn elects a mayor.  The municipality falls under the Sogn og Fjordane District Court and the Gulating Court of Appeal.

Municipal council
The municipal council  of Sunnfjord is made up of 45 representatives that are elected to four year terms. The party breakdown of the council is as follows:

Notable people

Public Service 
 Kolbeinn hrúga, a 12th-century Norse chieftain in Orkney, born in Sunnfjord, figures in the Orkneyinga saga
 Audun Hugleiksson (ca.1240–1302) a Norwegian nobleman, grew up in Jølster
 Brita Alvern, was put in trial accused of witchcraft at Indredale Skipreide in Sunnfjord in 1729
 John P. Munson (1860 in Jølster – 1928) a Norwegian-American zoologist and academic
 Ingolf Elster Christensen (1872 in Førde – 1943) a jurist, military officer and politician
 Nikolai Andreas Schei (1901–1985) & Andreas Olai Schei (1902–1989) from Førde, jurists and civil servants
 Leiv Erdal (1915 in Naustdal – 2009) a military officer, bailiff and politician
 Åsmund Reikvam (born 1944 in Førde) a Norwegian professor in medicine and former politician
 Arild Stubhaug (born 1948 in Naustdal) a mathematician, poet and biographer
 Anlaug Amanda Djupvik (born ca.1965 in Førde) astronomer of star formation  and initial mass function
 Bård Vegar Solhjell (born 1971) a former politician and minister, grew up in Sunnfjord
 Sigbjørn Gjelsvik (born 1974 in Naustdal), member of the Cabinet of Norway
 Himanshu Gulati (born 1988 in Førde) a Norwegian politician

The Arts 

 Anders Askevold (1834 in Askvoll – 1900) a painter of landscapes and animals
 Johannes Haarklou (1847 in Haukedalen – 1925) a composer, organist, conductor and music critic
 Hauk Aabel (1869 in Førde – 1961) a comedian and actor in Norwegian and Swedish silent films 
 Hjalmar Christensen (1869 in Sunnfjord – 1925) a writer and prominent literary critic
 Ludvig Eikaas (1920 in Jølster – 2010) a Norwegian painter, graphic artist and sculptor
 Gunnar S. Gundersen (1921 in Førde – 1983) or Gunnar S, a modernist painter
 Eldrid Lunden (born 1940 in Naustdal) a poet and Norway's first professor in creative writing
 Arve Furset (born 1964 in Askvoll) a composer, jazz musician and music producer
 Ole Jonny Eikefjord (born 1970 in Førde) a chef, cookbook author and restaurateur
 Kristian Eivind Espedal (born 1975 in Sunnfjord) stage name Gaahl, is a black metal vocalist, musician and painter
 Gunnar Garfors (born 1975) traveller, author, media professional and public speaker; grew up in Naustdal
 Olaug Nilssen (born 1977 in Førde) a novelist, playwright, children's writer and magazine editor
 Marianne Clementine Håheim (born 1987 in Jølster) a Norwegian author
 Thea Hjelmeland (born 1987 in Førde) a Norwegian musician, singer and songwriter
 Iselin Solheim (born 1990 in Naustdal) a Norwegian singer and songwriter

Sport 
 Håkon Fimland (1942 in Naustdal – 2016) a Norwegian hurdler and politician
 Martinus Grov (born 1974 in Førde) a retired archer, competed at the 1992, 1996 and 2000 Summer Olympics
 Asgeir Årdal (born 1983 in Jølster) a Norwegian cross-country skier, lives in Skei

Gallery

References

 
Municipalities of Vestland
2020 establishments in Norway